Michael Imhof Verlag is a German publishing company in Petersberg, Hesse. They are known especially for publishing books with a local interest, on art, on history, politics, religion, nature, and culture. Besides titles in German, they publish a limited number of books in English; a number of their titles, such as recent books on St. Elizabeth of Thuringia, have received international attention.

References

External links
Michael Imhof Verlag website

Publishing companies of Germany
Book publishing companies of Germany